The Tonkunstler Orchestra (German: Tonkünstler-Orchester Niederösterreich) is an Austrian orchestra based in Vienna and Sankt Pölten, Lower Austria.

Origin of the name

The orchestra's name has its origins in the Tonkünstler-Sozietät, Wien, which was organizing concerts in the era of Haydn and Mozart. This name lived on in the Viennese "Tonkünstler Orchestra Association", which was founded at the beginning of the 20th century. The first concert was performed in 1907 at the Musikverein presenting works of Karl Goldmark, Edvard Grieg, Franz Liszt and Ludwig van Beethoven. In 1913 the Viennese Tonkünstler Orchestra were the first to perform Arnold Schönberg's "Gurrelieder". The Sunday afternoon performances of the orchestra were very popular with the Viennese audience. During World War I, the orchestra had to merge with the so-called "Vienna Concertverein" due to financial hardships. The association continued to organise concerts until 1933.

History

In the mid-1930s, the National Socialist conductor Leopold Reichwein founded a new orchestra, which took the name N.S. Wiener Tonkünstlerorchester after Austria was annexed by Germany in 1938. The orchestra then became the Gausymphonieorchester Niederdonau in 1939. It was doing concerts throughout World War II, mostly with the  movement and in supporting the Wehrmacht. The orchestra renamed itself in 1945 to Landessymphonieorchester Niederösterreich. In 1946 this ensemble tied to the Tonkünstler tradition and called itself Niederösterreichisches Tonkünstlerorchester (Lower Austrian Tonkünstler Orchestra). The tradition of Sunday afternoon concerts was also revived. In 2002, the orchestra underwent a re-structuring process and is now called Tonkünstler-Orchester Niederösterreich (Tonkünstler Orchestra of Lower Austria). The Tonkünstler was the first Austrian orchestra with a division focused solely on music education.

From 2004 to 2009, Kristjan Järvi was principal conductor of the orchestra, and his work with the orchestra included a commercial recording of Leonard Bernstein's Mass. In the 2009–2010 season, Andrés Orozco-Estrada, who was the orchestra's assistant conductor for two years, took up the post of principal conductor. His current contract with the orchestra is through the 2014–2015 season, after which he is scheduled to step down as principal conductor. In November 2013, the orchestra announced the appointment of Yutaka Sado as its next principal conductor, effective with the 2015–2016 season, with an initial contract of 3 years. To mark the opening of the 10th Grafenegg Festival in August 2016, his contract with the Tonkunstler was extended until summer 2022.

Residencies
Tonkünstler Orchestra has its residencies in Vienna and Lower Austria. In Vienna, they perform concerts in the Golden Hall of the Musikverein. The Musikverein "Glass Hall" serves as the orchestra's rehearsal room. As the state orchestra of Lower Austria, Tonkünstler have a second residency in Festspielhaus St. Pölten. From summer 2007, the orchestra is also "orchestra in residence" at the international Grafenegg Music Festival.

Principal conductors

 Leopold Reichwein (1933–1939)
 Bert Costa (1939–1943)
 Friedrich Jung (1944–1945)
 Kurt Wöss (1946–1951)
 Gustav Koslik (1951–1964)
 Heinz Wallberg (1964–1975)
 Walter Weller (1975–1978)
 Miltiades Caridis (1978–1988)
 Isaac Karabtchevsky (1988–1994)
 Fabio Luisi (1994–2000)
 Carlos Kalmar (2000–2003)
 Kristjan Järvi (2004–2009)
 Andrés Orozco-Estrada (2009–2014)
 Yutaka Sado (2015–present)

References

External links
 

Austrian orchestras
Musical groups from Vienna
Sankt Pölten
1907 establishments in Austria
Musical groups established in 1933
Organisations based in Vienna
Musical groups established in 1907